Rachel Stephen-Smith (born 1971) is an Australian politician. She has been a Labor member of the Australian Capital Territory Legislative Assembly since 2016, representing the electorate of Kurrajong. Stephen-Smith grew up in O'Connor in Canberra's inner-north and attended local schools such as Lyneham High. Following school, Stephen-Smith attended the Australian National University and studied economics. Stephen-Smith previously worked as a senior public servant in the Australian Capital Territory public service, the Department of Prime Minister and Cabinet and as a Chief of Staff to Senator Kim Carr. Stephen-Smith has also worked in Washington DC at the Australian Embassy.

Following her election, Stephen-Smith was immediately appointed to cabinet, holding the following portfolios: Community Services and Social Inclusion; Disability, Children and Youth; Aboriginal and Torres Strait Islander Affairs; Multicultural Affairs; and Workplace Safety and Industrial Relations.

After a Cabinet reshuffle in August 2018, Stephen-Smith lost the Multicultural Affairs and Community Services portfolios to new Cabinet member Chris Steel, gaining the Government Services and Procurement and Urban Renewal portfolios. In July 2019, Stephen-Smith gained the Health portfolio from Meegan Fitzharris who resigned from the Cabinet, but due to the increase of workload, she later relinquished the Disability and Workplace Safety portfolios to Suzanne Orr in August 2019.

References

|-

1971 births
Living people
Australian Labor Party members of the Australian Capital Territory Legislative Assembly
Members of the Australian Capital Territory Legislative Assembly
21st-century Australian politicians
Women members of the Australian Capital Territory Legislative Assembly
21st-century Australian women politicians